"Don't Know How to Be" is a song by the band God Lives Underwater. It was originally released on their album Empty in 1995, resulting in significant airplay. The song was eventually remixed for the compilation CD DREgional Volume 1 for WDRE (former Philadelphia radio station).

Music video
Dean Karr directed the music video. It features the band playing live surrounded by bright and bleeding bright lights and colors mixed in with footage of the band hiding and walking through a wooded forest. The music video was featured in the PlayStation game Slamscape.

External links
 https://www.youtube.com/watch?v=j_4bwGrJtC8

1998 singles
God Lives Underwater songs
Song recordings produced by Rick Rubin
1995 songs
American Recordings (record label) singles